In 2011 Halmstads BK will compete in Allsvenskan and Svenska Cupen.

2011 season squad

|-
|colspan="14"|Former 2011 season players

Transfers

In

Out

Appearances and goals 
As of 29 May 2011

|-
|colspan="14"|Players who have departed the club after the start of the season:

|}

Matches

Pre-season/friendlies

Allsvenskan

Svenska cupen

Competitions

Allsvenskan

Standings

Results summary

Results by round

Season statistics

Allsvenskan 

= Number of bookings
8px= Number of sending offs after a second yellow card
= Number of sending offs by a direct red card

Svenska cupen 

= Number of bookings
8px= Number of sending offs after a second yellow card
= Number of sending offs by a direct red card

International players
Does only contain players that represent the senior squad during the 2011 season.

Youth

U-21

Senior

Called up - not participating
 Emil Salomonsson - Botswana vs Sweden, 1-2
 Ryan Miller - USA vs Chile, 1-1
 Tomas Žvirgždauskas - Lithuania vs Spain, 1-3

References

External links
 Halmstads BK homepage
 SvFF homepage

Halmstads BK seasons
Halmstad